Bulbophyllum sect. Cirrhopetalum is a section of the genus Bulbophyllum.   The taxon name comes from Latin cirrus (fringe) and Greek petalon (petal), hence meaning fringed-petaled.

Description
Plants in this genus are usually small plants with creeping rhizomes. Features that distinguish this genus are:
The dorsal sepal of Cirrhopetalum is much smaller than the usually inrolled lateral sepal which has adnate margins.
There is generally an umbellate inflorescence which can be upright, pendulous or arching.
The pseudobulbs are conical-shaped and obscurely angled with a single spoon-like leaf atop each pseudobulb.

Distribution
Plants from this section are found in Africa and Asia.

Species
Bulbophyllum section Cirrhopetalum comprises the following species:

References 

Braem GJ. 1986 Bulbophyllum oder Cirrhopetalum. Orchidee, 37. (5)

Rysy W. 2004 Cirrhopetalum - historical overview, critical remarks and new suggestions regarding the genus. Orchid Rev. 112. (1256): 77-81

Orchid subgenera
Epiphytic orchids